XHITO-FM is a radio station on 106.3 FM in Irapuato, Guanajuato. XHITO is owned by ACIR and carries its La Comadre grupera format.

History
XHITO received its concession in October 1993. It was owned by José Trinidad Rubio Barba. ACIR acquired the concession in 1996.

References

Spanish-language radio stations
Radio stations in Guanajuato
Radio stations established in 1993
Grupo ACIR